University—Rosedale is a federal electoral district in Ontario, Canada, that has been represented in the House of Commons of Canada since 2015.

History
University—Rosedale was created by the 2012 federal electoral boundaries redistribution and was legally defined in the 2013 representation order. It came into effect upon the call of the 42nd Canadian federal election in October 2015.  The riding was created out of the northern parts of the electoral districts of Trinity—Spadina and Toronto Centre.

Geography
The riding includes the entire campus of the University of Toronto, plus the Toronto neighbourhoods of Rosedale, Little Italy, the Annex and Yorkville, among others, plus the northwestern portion of Downtown Toronto.

Demographics 
According to the 2021 Canada Census

Ethnic groups: 61.2% White, 14.4% Chinese, 6.1% South Asian, 3.5% Black, 2.2% Latin American, 2.1% Korean, 1.6% Arab, 1.6% West Asian, 1.4% Filipino, 1.3% Indigenous, 1.3% Southeast Asian

Languages: 60.4% English, 6.3% Mandarin, 3.7% Cantonese, 2.8% Portuguese, 2.3% Spanish, 2.2% French, 1.6% Italian, 1.5% Korean, 1.2% Arabic, 1.1% Russian, 1.1% Persian

Religions: 34.8% Christian (18.0% Catholic, 4.0% Anglican, 2.3% Christian Orthodox, 2.1% United Church, 1.1% Presbyterian, 7.3% Other), 6.9% Jewish, 4.4% Muslim, 2.1% Buddhist, 2.1% Hindu, 48.3% None

Median income: $47,200 (2020)

Average income: $103,900 (2020)

Members of Parliament

This riding has elected the following Members of Parliament:

Election results

References

External links
University—Rosedale boundary map & description (Elections.ca)

Ontario federal electoral districts
Federal electoral districts of Toronto
2013 establishments in Ontario